WINI (1420 AM) is a radio station broadcasting an oldies format. Licensed to Murphysboro, Illinois, the station is owned by Southern Illinois Radio Group, and carries Westwood One's Good Time Oldies network.

History
The station began broadcasting September 15, 1954, and ran 500 watts, during daytime hours only. Nighttime operations were added on September 14, 1978, running 500 watts with a directional array.

The station aired an adult contemporary format in the 1980s. In 1990, WINI adopted a news-talk format. The station carried a variety of local programming and nationally syndicated shows such as Glenn Beck, Dr. Laura, John Gibson, Jim Bohannon, and Phil Hendrie. On August 22, 2016, the station adopted an oldies format.

Translator
In September 2015, WINI began to be rebroadcast on 93.5 FM, through a translator in Carbondale, Illinois (W228DC). Now licensed to Sparta, Illinois on 97.3 FM as W247CP, the translator rebroadcasts WHCO.

References

External links
 WINI's website

INI
Oldies radio stations in the United States
Radio stations established in 1954
1954 establishments in Illinois